The following is a list of the 514 communes of the Bas-Rhin department of France.

The communes cooperate in the following intercommunalities (as of 2020):
Eurométropole de Strasbourg
Communauté d'agglomération de Haguenau
Communauté d'agglomération Sarreguemines Confluences (partly)
Communauté de communes de l'Alsace Bossue
Communauté de communes de la Basse Zorn
Communauté de communes du canton d'Erstein
Communauté de communes de Hanau-La Petite Pierre
Communauté de communes du Kochersberg
Communauté de communes de la Mossig et du Vignoble
Communauté de communes de l'Outre-Forêt
Communauté de communes du Pays de Barr
Communauté de communes du Pays de Niederbronn-les-Bains
Communauté de communes du Pays Rhénan
Communauté de communes du Pays de Sainte-Odile
Communauté de communes du Pays de Saverne
Communauté de communes du Pays de Wissembourg
Communauté de communes du Pays de la Zorn
Communauté de communes de la Plaine du Rhin
Communauté de communes des Portes de Rosheim
Communauté de communes de la Région de Molsheim-Mutzig
Communauté de communes du Ried de Marckolsheim (partly)
Communauté de communes Sauer-Pechelbronn
Communauté de communes de Sélestat
Communauté de communes de la Vallée de la Bruche
Communauté de communes de la Vallée de Villé

See also 
 Arrondissements of the Bas-Rhin department
 Cantons of the Bas-Rhin department
 Lists of communes of France
 Administrative divisions of France

References

Bas-Rhin